These are some of the political parties from the Valencian Country:

(*)These parties are part of the Coalició Compromís.

(**) Counting all of the councillors of the parties members of Coalició Compromís.

(***) Counting the deputy obtained by Esquerra Unida del País Valencià in coalition with Els Verds del País Valencià.

References

Valencian